The Eocene–Oligocene extinction event, also called the Eocene-Oligocene transition or Grande Coupure, is the transition between the end of the Eocene and the beginning of the Oligocene, an extinction event and faunal turnover occurring between 33.9 and 33.4 million years ago marked by large-scale extinction and floral and faunal turnover (although minor in comparison to the largest mass extinctions). Most of the affected organisms were marine or aquatic in nature. They included the last of the ancient ungulates, the "condylarths".

This was a time of major climatic change, especially cooling, not clearly caused by any single major impact or volcanic event. Extended volcanic activity is one possible cause. Another speculation points to several large meteorite impacts near this time, including those of the Chesapeake Bay crater  and the Popigai impact structure  of central Siberia, which scattered debris perhaps as far as Europe. New dating of the Popigai meteor strengthens its association with the extinction.

Causes

Glaciation
A leading model of climate cooling at this time predicts a decrease in atmospheric carbon dioxide, which slowly declined over the course of the Middle to Late Eocene. This cooling reached some threshold approximately 34 million years ago, precipitating the formation of a large ice sheet in East Antarctica in response to falling carbon dioxide levels. Though ephemeral ice sheets may have existed on the Antarctic continent during parts of the Middle and Late Eocene, this interval of severe global cooling marked the beginning of permanent ice sheet coverage of Antarctica.

Evidence points to the glaciation of Antarctica occurring in two steps, with the first step, the less pronounced and more modest step of the two, taking place at the Eocene-Oligocene boundary itself. This first step is referred to as EOT-1. The Oligocene Oi-1 event, an oxygen isotope excursion that occurred around 33.55 million years ago, was the second major pulse of Antarctic ice sheet formation.

Effects on life

Grande Coupure
The Grande Coupure, or "great break" in French, with a major European turnover in mammalian fauna about 33.5 Ma, marks the end of the last phase of Eocene assemblages, the Priabonian, and the arrival in Europe of Asian species. The Grande Coupure is characterized by widespread extinctions and allopatric speciation in small isolated relict populations. It was given its name in 1910 by the Swiss palaeontologist Hans Georg Stehlin, to characterise the dramatic turnover of European mammalian fauna, which he placed at the Eocene-Oligocene boundary. A comparable turnover in Asian fauna has since been called the "Mongolian Remodelling".

The Grande Coupure marks a break between endemic European faunas before the break and mixed faunas with a strong Asian component afterwards. J. J. Hooker and his team summarized the break:
"Pre-Grande Coupure faunas are dominated by the perissodactyl family Palaeotheriidae (distant horse relatives), six families of artiodactyls (cloven-hoofed mammals) (Anoplotheriidae, Xiphodontidae, Choeropotamidae, Cebochoeridae, Dichobunidae and Amphimerycidae), the rodent family Pseudosciuridae, the primate families Omomyidae and Adapidae, and the archontan family Nyctitheriidae.

"Post-Grande Coupure faunas include the true rhinoceros (family Rhinocerotidae), three artiodactyl families (Entelodontidae, Anthracotheriidae and Gelocidae) related respectively to pigs, hippos and ruminants, the rodent families Eomyidae, Cricetidae (hamsters) and Castoridae (beavers), and the lipotyphlan family Erinaceidae (hedgehogs). The speciose genus Palaeotherium plus Anoplotherium and the families Xiphodontidae and Amphimerycidae were observed to disappear completely.

"Only the marsupial family Herpetotheriidae, the artiodactyl family Cainotheriidae, and the rodent families Theridomyidae and Gliridae (dormice) crossed the faunal divide undiminished."

It has been suggested that this was caused by climate change associated with the earliest polar glaciations and a major fall in sea levels, or by competition with taxa dispersing from Asia. However, few argue for an isolated single cause. Other possible causes are related to the impact of one or more large bolides in northern hemisphere at Popigai, Toms Canyon and Chesapeake Bay. Improved correlation of northwest European successions to global events confirms the Grande Coupure as occurring in the earliest Oligocene, with a hiatus of about 350 millennia prior to the first record of post-Grande Coupure Asian immigrant taxa.

An element of the paradigm of the Grande Coupure was the apparent extinction of all European primates at the Coupure.  However, the 1999 discovery of a mouse-sized early Oligocene omomyid, reflecting the better survival chances of small mammals, undercut the Grand Coupure paradigm.

Evidence in the world's ocean current system indicates an abrupt cooling from 34.1 to 33.6 Ma across the Eocene–Oligocene boundary at 33.9 Ma. The remarkable cooling period in the ocean is correlated with pronounced mammalian faunal replacement within continental Asia as well. The Asian biotic reorganization events are comparable to the Grande Coupure in Europe and the Mongolian Remodeling of mammalian communities. The global cooling is also correlated with marked drying conditions in low-latitudes Asia.

References

External links
 Extinction an essay by Richard Cowen

Extinction events